A remote access service (RAS) is any combination of hardware and software to enable the remote access tools or information that typically reside on a network of IT devices.

A remote access service connects a client to a host computer, known as a remote access server. The most common approach to this service is remote control of a computer  by using another device which needs internet or any other network connection.

Here are the connection steps:
 User dials into a PC at the office.
 Then the office PC logs into a file server where the needed information is stored.
 The remote PC takes control of the office PC's monitor and keyboard, allowing the remote user to view and manipulate information, execute commands, and exchange files.
Many computer manufacturers and large businesses' help desks use this service widely for technical troubleshooting of their customers' problems. Therefore you can find various professional first-party, third-party, open source, and freeware remote desktop applications. Which some of those are cross-platform across various versions of Windows, macOS, UNIX, and Linux. Remote desktop programs may include LogMeIn or TeamViewer. 

To use RAS from a remote node, a RAS client program is needed, or any PPP client software. Most remote control programs work with RAS. PPP is a set of industry standard framing and authentication protocols that enable remote access.

Microsoft Remote Access Server (RAS) is the predecessor to Microsoft Routing and Remote Access Server (RRAS). RRAS is a Microsoft Windows Server feature that allows Microsoft Windows clients to remotely access a Microsoft Windows network.

History 
The term was originally coined by Microsoft when referring to their built-in Windows NT remote access tools. RAS is a service provided by Windows NT which allows most of the services which would be available on a network to be accessed over a modem link. The service includes support for dialup and logon, presents the same network interface as the normal network drivers (albeit slightly slower). RAS works with several major network protocols, including TCP/IP, IPX, and NBF. It is not necessary to run Windows NT on the client—there are client versions for other Windows operating systems. RAS enables users to log into an NT-based LAN using a modem, X.25 connection or WAN link.

Starting in the mid-1990s, several manufacturers such as U.S. Robotics produced "modem terminal servers". Instead of having RS-232 ports, these would directly incorporate an analog modem. These devices were commonly used by Internet service providers to allow consumer dial-up. Modern versions interface to an ISDN PRI instead of having analog modem ports.

Remote access services are now commonly used for online technical support for personal computers. The first instance of this was in 1987 in the United Kingdom, provided by a company called Jade Technologies. This used the MS-DOS based program called PC Anywhere to directly link into MS-DOS and early Windows-based PCs. The company had been providing RAS support for Unix based corporate systems since 1985.

See also 
 Routing and Remote Access Service

References 

Windows communication and services
Modems